Hederifolium is Latin for "ivy-leaved", and is the species name of two plants:

Cyclamen hederifolium, a widespread and commonly cultivated perennial
Pelargonium peltatum, illegitimately named Pelargonium hederifolium